"Wrapped Up" is a song by English singer-songwriter Olly Murs, released as the lead single from his fourth studio album, Never Been Better (2014). It features American rapper Travie McCoy. The song was released on 7 October 2014 in France and 16 November 2014 in the United Kingdom by Epic Records and Syco Music.

Background
It was written by Murs, McCoy, Steve Robson and Claude Kelly, and it was produced by Robson. The song premiered on 7 October 2014, in the United Kingdom on Capital FM. On 23 October 2014, the song temporarily became available as an instant download upon pre-ordering Never Been Better, but was removed by iTunes in a matter of hours.

Music video
The official music video was filmed in Los Angeles and was uploaded onto Murs's Vevo account on 28 October 2014. It shows Murs and several dancers on travelators. McCoy is not seen.

Live performances
Olly performed the song on The X Factor Australia on 20 October, Sunrise on 21 October and The X Factor UK on 16 November. Olly also performed the song at BBC Radio 1's Big Weekend 2015 in Norwich, with Radio One DJ Nick Grimshaw performing the rap.

Track listing
Digital download
"Wrapped Up" (featuring Travie McCoy) – 3:05

CD Single
"Wrapped Up" (featuring Travie McCoy) – 3:05
"Wrapped Up" (featuring Travie McCoy) [Cahill Radio Mix] — 3:36

Digital EP
"Wrapped Up" (featuring Travie McCoy) – 3:05
"Wrapped Up" (Live for The Sun's Fabulous magazine) — 2:53
"Wrapped Up" (featuring Travie McCoy) [Cahill Radio Mix] — 3:36
"Wrapped Up" (featuring Travie McCoy) [Westfunk Radio Mix] — 3:12

Charts

Weekly charts

Year-end charts

Certifications

Release history

References

2014 singles
Olly Murs songs
Travie McCoy songs
Song recordings produced by Steve Robson
Songs written by Olly Murs
Songs written by Steve Robson
Songs written by Claude Kelly
2014 songs
Syco Music singles
Epic Records singles
Songs written by Travie McCoy